The 1985 New Orleans Saints season was the Saints 19th season.

The offseason began with rampant rumors the franchise was on its way out of town. Original owner John W. Mecom Jr. was anxious to sell the team, and he threatened to move to Jacksonville, Florida if no suitable owner could be found.

In May, local car magnate Tom Benson stepped up and pledged to meet Mecom's asking price of $70 million. Mecom and Benson sat down with Louisiana governor Edwin W. Edwards and hammered out a deal, which was finalized May 31. Prior to the sale to Benson, businessman Abram Nicholas Pritzker attempted to purchase the team, but he could not meet Mecom's asking price, and Edwards was unable to secure a loan from the Louisiana Legislature to assist Pritzker.

Benson moved training camp from Vero Beach, Florida to Louisiana Tech University in Ruston. The team quickly brought in local legend and United States Football League standout Bobby Hebert to compete with Richard Todd and Dave Wilson for the starting quarterback position. Hebert won the position late in the season and started the final five games.

Coach Bum Phillips offered to resign when Benson completed his purchase, but Benson declined the offer. The season got off to a disastrous start, as the Saints were routed 47–27 at home by the Kansas City Chiefs, and an angry woman poured a cup of beer on Phillips as he exited the field. The Saints won three consecutive games following a week two loss at Denver, but the season quickly turned sour, thanks to a six-game losing streak that dropped the club to 3-8.

One day after winning at Minnesota to end the skid, Phillips resigned. His son, defensive coordinator Wade Phillips, took over as interim coach for the final four games. The Saints won their first game under the younger Phillips, routing the eventual NFC West champion Los Angeles Rams 29-3, but losses to the Cardinals, 49ers and Falcons ended the year on another glum note.

The Saints finished with a non-winning record for the nineteenth time in as many seasons, going 5–11. Benson promised big changes following the campaign, which he delivered upon.

Offseason

NFL Draft

Personnel

Staff

Roster

Regular season

Schedule

Game summaries

Week 8

Week 12 

    
    
    
    
    
    
    
    
    
    
    

 Earl Campbell 35 Rush, 160 Yds

Week 15 

    
    
    
    
    
    
    
    
    

Joe Montana 25/38, 354 Yds

Standings

Notable events 
On opening day, quarterback Dave Wilson set the unwanted record of completing only two of twenty-two passes: the lowest pass completion percent in an NFL game for any quarterback with a double figure total of attempts.

References

External links 
 1985 New Orleans Saints at Pro-Football-Reference.com

New Orleans Saints
New Orleans Saints seasons
New